Broughton East is a civil parish in the South Lakeland District of Cumbria, England.  It contains 20 listed buildings that are recorded in the National Heritage List for England.  Of these, one is listed at Grade II*, the middle of the three grades, and the others are at Grade II, the lowest grade.  The parish contains the village of Field Broughton and smaller settlements, and is otherwise rural.  Most of the listed buildings are houses and associated structures, farmhouses and farm buildings.  The other listed buildings consist of two folly towers, a milestone, an animal pound, a limekiln, and a church.


Key

Buildings

References

Citations

Sources

Lists of listed buildings in Cumbria